Dalailama bifurca is a moth in the Endromidae family. It was described by Staudinger in 1896. It was described from Kuku Noor.

References

Natural History Museum Lepidoptera generic names catalog

Endromidae
Moths described in 1896